Casar may refer to:

Places

Spain
 Casar de Cáceres
 Casar de Palomero
 El Casar
 El Casar de Escalona

United States
 Casar, North Carolina

Other uses
 CASAR, German wire rope manufacturer, part of WireCo Worldgroup
 El Casar (Madrid Metro)
 Operation Cäsar, part of the German army attack Operation Doppelkopf in World War II

People with the surname
 Amira Casar, French actress
 Greg Casar (born 1989), American politician
 Sandy Casar, French racing cyclist